Patrick Debucke (born 24 October 1957) is a Belgian sprint canoer who competed in the mid-1980s. At the 1984 Summer Olympics in Los Angeles, he finished ninth in the K-2 1000 m event with his teammate Patrick Hanssens, while being eliminated in the semifinals of the K-2 500 m event.

References
Sports-Reference.com profile

1957 births
Belgian male canoeists
Canoeists at the 1984 Summer Olympics
Living people
Olympic canoeists of Belgium